Now is a 1973 album by British pop group the New Seekers. It was retitled Pinball Wizards in the US.

Overview 
Released in March 1973, the album coincided with the release of their latest hit single "Pinball Wizard/See Me Feel Me", which reached #16 in the UK. This single was a medley of two songs taken from the Who's rock opera Tommy and employed a harder-edged sound for the group, with heavy use of electric guitars and vocals more in line with a typical rock style. The Who's Pete Townshend congratulated the group on their version of the song. However, no other singles were issued from the album. Now reached #47 in the UK album charts. The New Musical Express reviewed the album on its release, and while criticising the group for their middle of the road nature, it did go on to state: "Nobody denies their natural vocal ability, and I'll go so far as to say the harmonies are excellent".

This was to be the group's last album for a year and was the last album to feature member Peter Doyle, who left the group in mid-1973 to be replaced by Peter Oliver.

In the US, the album was released under the title Pinball Wizards with alternate artwork and a slightly different track listing. The title track single had become one of the group's biggest hits there, peaking at #29. This would also be the group's final single to chart. The album itself reached #190.

Track listing (UK) 
Side One
 "Pinball Wizard/See Me Feel Me" (Pete Townshend)
 "A Brand New Song" (Jeff Barry, Paul Williams)
 "Look Look" (Marty Kristian)
 "That's My Guy" (Merrill Osmond, Alan Osmond)
 "Feeling" (P. Yellowstone, J. Schwartz)
 "Utah" (Merrill Osmond)
Side Two
 "Reaching Out for Someone" (Dick Holler)
 "Everything Changing" (W. Cates, P. Caldwell)
 "Time Limit" (Kristian, Peter Doyle)
 "Rain" (José Feliciano, H. Feliciano)
 "Somebody Somewhere" (Cook, Greenaway, Rae)
 "Goin' Back" (Gerry Goffin, Carole King)

Track listing (US) 
Side One
 "Pinball Wizard/See Me Feel Me" (3.27)
 "A Brand New Song" (2.56)
 "Look Look" (2.54)
 "That's My Guy" (3.10)
 "Feelin'" (3.14)
 "Utah" (2.16)
Side Two
 "Reaching Out for Someone" (2.59)
 "With Everything Changing" (3.24)
 "Time Limit" (3.03)
 "Somebody Somewhere" (2.20)
 "The Further We Reach Out" (Paul Cartledge, Frank Fields, Ken Ashby) (3.23)

Personnel 
 Michael Lloyd - Producer
 David Mackay - Producer on "Look Look", "Everything Changing", "Rain", "Somebody Somewhere", "Goin' Back"
 Tommy Oliver - Arranger
 Marty Kristian - Vocals, lead vocals on "Pinball Wizard/See Me Feel Me", "Look Look", "Time Limit"
 Peter Doyle - Vocals, lead vocals on "Pinball Wizard/See Me Feel Me", "Utah", "Goin' Back", "The Further We Reach Out"
 Eve Graham - Vocals, lead vocals on "That's My Guy", "Reaching Out for Someone"
 Lyn Paul - Vocals, lead vocals on "Everything Changing"
 Paul Layton - Vocals

References 

1973 albums
The New Seekers albums
Albums produced by David Mackay (producer)
Polydor Records albums